Baidyanathdham  railway station (station code BDME) is a railway station in Deoghar district, Jharkhand. The station serves the Baidyanathdham area of Deoghar city. The station consists of one platform. The platform is not well sheltered, and it lacks many facilities including water and sanitation.

Station layout

Track layout

See also

References

External links 

 Ministry of Railways. (Official site) 

Railway stations in Deoghar district
Asansol railway division
Transport in Deoghar